Sphenophorus germari is a species in the family Curculionidae (snout and bark beetles).  It is found in North America.

References

Further reading

 
 
 
 

Dryophthorinae